Remy Shand (born October 14, 1977) is a Canadian R&B/soul singer, who released his debut album, The Way I Feel, on Motown Records in 2002.

Early life
Shand was born to parents Doug and Lana Shand.

Career
Shand became a fan of artists such as Stevie Wonder, The Isley Brothers, Marvin Gaye, Steely Dan and Earth, Wind & Fire. During 1998 he began to write and record songs independently. Three years later, he was signed to Motown Records, and these songs became the basis for his first album, The Way I Feel which was released on March 12, 2002. The album and won a Juno Award for Best R&B/Soul Recording in the 2003 Juno Awards.  In 2002, Shand also recorded hit singles "Rock Steady" and "Take A Message".

Accolades
Shand also received four Grammy nominations for his work.

Discography

Studio albums

EPs

Singles 
"Take a Message" (2001), Universal
"The Way I Feel" (2001), Universal
"Rocksteady" (2001), Universal
"Lust" (2013), Remy Records
"Song for Mark Gonzales" (2013), Remy Records
"Where Are We Going" (2013), Remy Records
"Springtime (Live)" (2013), Remy Records
"Worms (Instrumental)" (2013), Remy Records
"Mainline" (2013), Remy Records
"The Best In Me" (2014), Remy Records
"Son Of Night" (2014), Remy Records
"Politicians" (2014), Remy Records
"The Price I Pay" (2015), Remy Records
"Electronic Flesh" (2015), Remy Records
"Lament of Nine" (2015), Remy Records
"Man of Time" (2015), Remy Records
"Washington Square" (2015), Remy Records
"Serafin" (2015), Remy Records
"Peer Pressure" (2015), Remy Records
"Event Horizon" (2015), Remy Records
"My Hollywood" (2016), Remy Records

Awards and nominations
Juno Awards

Grammy Awards

References

General

External links 

 
 Remy Shand on YouTube

1977 births
Canadian contemporary R&B singers
Canadian male singer-songwriters
Canadian singer-songwriters
Juno Award for R&B/Soul Recording of the Year winners
Living people
Musicians from Winnipeg
Motown artists
Neo soul singers
Canadian soul singers
21st-century Canadian male singers